The 1970 FIFA World Cup qualification UEFA Group 1 was a UEFA qualifying group for the 1970 FIFA World Cup. The group comprised Greece, Portugal, Romania and Switzerland.

Standings

Matches

External links 
Group 1 Detailed Results at RSSSF

1
1968–69 in Greek football
1969–70 in Greek football
1968–69 in Portuguese football
1969–70 in Portuguese football
1968–69 in Romanian football
1969–70 in Romanian football
1968–69 in Swiss football
1969–70 in Swiss football